The 2020 edition of the Liga Futebol Amadora Terceira Divisão was canceled by the FFTL due to the COVID-19 pandemic. The FFTL decided to hold only two official competitions for the 2020 season: The 2020 Copa FFTL and Taça 12 de Novembro.

Clubs that would participate in the competition
AC Mamura
AD Maubisse
ADR União
AS Lero (Lautem)
AS Inur Transforma
Cacusan CF
FC Lero (Iliomar)
Karau Fuik FC (Viqueque)
Kuda Ulun FC
Laleia United FC
YMCA FC

References

External links
Official website

Timor-Leste
2020 in East Timorese sport